Arlene Martel (born Arline Greta Sax; April 14, 1936 – August 12, 2014) was an American actress. Before 1964, she was frequently billed as Arline Sax or Arlene Sax.  Casting directors, among other Hollywood insiders, called Martel the Chameleon because her appearance and her proficiency with accents and dialects enabled her to portray characters of a wide range of races and ethnicities.

Early life

Martel was born Arline Sax in The Bronx and attended the Performing Arts High School in New York.

Career
Martel was billed as "Arline Sax" during the early years of her television career.

Two of her earliest appearances were in The Twilight Zone TV series. The first was the episode "What You Need" as a woman in the bar. The second was the episode "Twenty Two", as a nurse who repeatedly utters the sinister phrase "Room for one more, Honey!" at the entrance to a hospital morgue and at the door of a doomed airplane.

Martel appeared in a 1960 episode of The Rebel, "The Hunted", in which she had a scene with Leonard Nimoy, before they were reunited in an iconic episode of Star Trek, "Amok Time". She was also featured in two 1961 episodes of Route 66: "Legacy for Lucia", in which she had the title role of a Sicilian girl who inherits an American soldier's estate, and "The Newborn", in which she played a mother who dies in childbirth. She appeared in an episode of the TV series Hong Kong in 1961, opposite Rod Taylor.

In 1962, she made the first of two appearances on Perry Mason, as Fiona Cregan in "The Case of the Absent Artist". In 1966 she guest-starred as Sandra Dunkel in "The Case of the Dead Ringer", in which, aside from his role as Mason, Raymond Burr played the murderer, Grimes.

Other roles include the princess Sarafina on the Have Gun – Will Travel episode "The Princess and the Gunfighter" (1961); a female cosmonaut on episode 13 of I Dream of Jeannie, "Russian Roulette" (1965); a Hungarian immigrant on The Fugitive episode "The Blessings of Liberty" (1966); the French Resistance contact Tiger in five episodes of Hogan's Heroes (1965–71); and the evil witch Malvina on the Bewitched episode "How Not to Lose Your Head to King Henry VIII (Part 1)" (1971).

Martel's science fiction roles include The Outer Limits episode "Demon with a Glass Hand" (1964) and the Star Trek episode "Amok Time" (1967) as the scheming and duplicitous, but extremely logical, T'Pring, who is betrothed to Mr. Spock and expected to become his consort.
In 1973 Arlene played a movie actress turned princess on the 3rd episode of Banacek entitled "The Three Million Dollar Piracy" referenced here 

On Columbo, Martel played Gloria West, mistress of murder victim Tony Goodland (Bradford Dillman), in season 2, episode 2, "The Greenhouse Jungle" (1972), and the salesgirl in the episode "A Friend in Deed" (1974).

In 1974, she was billed as "Tasha Martelle" for the role of secretary Marty Bach in The Rockford Files episode "Trouble in Chapter 17." She appeared as the title character in the Gunsmoke episode "The Squaw" (1975).

Other shows on which Martel appeared included The Restless Gun (episode "A Bell for Santo Domingo", The Man from U.N.C.L.E., The Untouchables, Mission: Impossible, Here Come the Brides, The Wild Wild West, Battlestar Galactica, The Monkees, Mannix, The Rookies, and The Six Million Dollar Man. In the fourth season of "Mission: Impossible" she was reunited with Leonard Nimoy in the episode "Terror," where she played an imprisoned terrorist's ruthless wife.

Martel also appeared in feature films, including The Glass Cage (1964), in the starring role. Angels from Hell (1968) and Chatterbox (1977). She received top billing as the commandant in charge of a Russian road crew in Zoltan, Hound of Dracula (1978), although it was only a bit part, lasting less than five minutes.

Martel semi-retired from acting in the mid-1980s, but continued to act sporadically. She appeared in several TV episodes and some unsold TV pilots in the early 2000s. She said that even in her early career, she got most of her work by word of mouth, not through talent agents. In her later years, she often said, "I don't have a good agent who will get me the plum roles."

Late-life roles included a Vulcan priestess in the Star Trek fan film "Of Gods and Men" in a scene with her "Amok Time" suitor Lawrence Montaigne reprising his role as Stonn, and as one of the narrators of the 2015 documentary film Unity, which was released a year after her death.

Personal life and death
Martel was a regular at Star Trek conventions worldwide from 1972 to 2014. Her last convention appearance was at TrekTrax Atlanta in Atlanta, Georgia, on April 25–27, 2014, four months before her death.

Martel battled breast cancer for the last five years of her life. On August 12, 2014, she died from complications of a heart attack at a hospital in Santa Monica, California. She was 78.

References

External links
 
 

1936 births
2014 deaths
American film actresses
American television actresses
American acting coaches
American people of Austrian-Jewish descent
Actresses from New York City
People from the Bronx
20th-century American actresses
21st-century American actresses
Jewish American actresses
21st-century American Jews